Bedini is a surname. Notable people with the surname include:

Gaetano Bedini, (1806–1864), Italian Catholic church dignitary
Silvio Bedini, (1917–2007), American historian
Ignazio Bedini, Italian catholic archbishop

See also
16672 Bedini
Bedini Bugyal, a Himalayan alpine meadow